Otto Weininger (3 April 1880 – 4 October 1903) was an Austrian philosopher who lived in the Austro-Hungarian Empire. In 1903, he published the book Geschlecht und Charakter (Sex and Character), which gained popularity after his suicide at the age of 23. Parts of his work were adapted for use by the Nazi regime (which at the same time denounced him).  Weininger had a strong influence on Ludwig Wittgenstein, August Strindberg, Julius Evola, and, via his lesser-known work Über die letzten Dinge, on James Joyce.

Life 
Otto Weininger was born on 3 April 1880 in Vienna, a son of the Jewish goldsmith Leopold Weininger and his wife Adelheid. After attending primary school and graduating from secondary school in July 1898, Weininger registered at the University of Vienna in October of the same year. He studied philosophy and psychology but took courses in natural sciences and medicine as well. Weininger learned Greek, Latin, French and English very early, later also Spanish and Italian, and acquired passive knowledge of Swedish, Danish and Norwegian.

He met Sigmund Freud, who did not, however, recommend the text to a publisher. His professors accepted the thesis and Weininger received his Ph.D. degree in July 1902. Shortly thereafter he became a Protestant.

In 1902 Weininger went to Bayreuth, where he witnessed a performance of Richard Wagner's Parsifal, which left him deeply impressed. Via Dresden and Copenhagen he made his way to Christiania (Oslo), where he saw for the first time Henrik Ibsen's liberation drama Peer Gynt on stage. Upon his return to Vienna Weininger suffered from fits of deep depression. The decision to take his own life gradually took shape; after a long discussion with his friend Artur Gerber, however, Weininger realized that "it is not yet time".

In June 1903, after months of concentrated work, his book Sex and Character: A Fundamental Investigation – an attempt "to place sex relations in a new and decisive light" – was published by the Vienna publishers Braumüller & Co. The book contained his thesis to which three vital chapters were added: (XII) "The Nature of Woman and her Relation to the Universe", (XIII) "Judaism", (XIV) "Women and Humanity".

Although the book was not negatively received, it did not create the expected stir. Weininger was attacked by Paul Julius Möbius, professor in Leipzig and author of the book On the Physiological Deficiency of Women and was accused of plagiarizing. Deeply disappointed and seemingly depressed, Weininger left for Italy.

Back in Vienna he spent his last five days with his parents. On 3 October he took a room in the house at Schwarzspanierstraße 15, where Ludwig van Beethoven had died. He told the landlady that he was not to be disturbed before morning, since he planned to work and then to go to bed late. That night he wrote two letters, one to his father and the other to his brother Richard, telling them that he was going to shoot himself.

On 4 October Weininger was found mortally wounded, having shot himself in the chest. He died in the Wiener Allgemeines Krankenhaus (Vienna General Hospital) and was buried in the Matzleinsdorf Protestant Cemetery in Vienna.

Sex and Character

Masculinity and femininity
Sex and Character argues that all people are composed of a mixture of male and female substance, and attempts to support this view scientifically. The male aspect is active, productive, conscious and moral/logical, while the female aspect is passive, unproductive, unconscious and amoral/alogical. Weininger argues that emancipation is only possible for the "masculine woman", e.g. some lesbians and that the female life is consumed with the sexual function: both with the act, as a prostitute, and the product, as a mother. The woman is a "matchmaker". By contrast, the duty of the male, or the masculine aspect of personality, is to strive to become a genius and to forgo sexuality for an abstract love of the absolute, God, which he finds within himself.

A significant part of his book is about the nature of genius. Weininger argues that genius never applies solely to a specific field such as mathematics or music, but there is only the universal genius, in whom everything exists and makes sense. He reasons that this quality is probably present in all people to some degree. Sex and Character became popular in Italy as an alternative to Freudian psychoanalysis due to the interest it generated among Italian intellectuals such as Steno Tedeschi, who translated the text to Italian.

Jewishness vs. Christianity
In a separate chapter, Weininger, himself a Jew who had converted to Christianity in 1902, analyzes the archetypal Jew as feminine, and thus profoundly irreligious, without true individuality (soul), and without a sense of good and evil. Christianity is described as "the highest expression of the highest faith", while Judaism is called "the extreme of cowardliness". Weininger decries the decay of modern times, and attributes much of it to feminine (or identically, "Jewish") character. By Weininger's reckoning everyone shows some femininity, and what he calls "Jewishness".

Critique of the Zeitgeist
On Jewishness, decadence and femininity:Our age, which is not only the most Jewish, but also the most effeminate of all ages; an age in which art represents only a sudarium of its humors; the age of the most gullible anarchism, without any understanding of the State and of justice; the age of the collectivist ethics of the species; the age in which history is viewed with the most astonishing lack of seriousness [historical materialism]; the age of capitalism and of Marxism; the age in which history, life, and science no longer mean anything, apart from economics and technology; the age when genius could be declared a form of madness, while it no longer possesses even one great artist or philosopher; the age of the least originality and its greatest pursuit; the age which can boast of being the first to have exalted eroticism, but not in order to forget oneself, the way the Romans or the Greeks did in their Bacchanalia, but in order to have the illusion of rediscovering oneself and giving substance to one’s vanity.

Reactions to suicide
Weininger's suicide in the house where Beethoven had diedthe man he considered one of the greatest geniuses of allmade him a cause célèbre, inspired several imitation suicides, and generated interest in his book. The book received glowing reviews by Swedish author August Strindberg, who wrote that it had "probably solved the hardest of all problems", the "woman problem". It furthermore attracted the attention of Russian philosopher Nikolai Berdyaev, who claimed that "after Nietzsche there was nothing already in this [modern German] fleeting culture so remarkable."

Influence on Wittgenstein 
Ludwig Wittgenstein read the book as a schoolboy and was deeply impressed by it, later listing it as one of his influences and recommending it to friends. Wittgenstein is recalled as saying that he thought Weininger was "a great genius".  However, Wittgenstein's deep admiration of Weininger's thought was coupled with a fundamental disagreement with his position. Wittgenstein writes to G. E. Moore: "It isn't necessary or rather not possible to agree with him but the greatness lies in that with which we disagree. It is his enormous mistake which is great." In the same letter to Moore, Wittgenstein added that if one were to add a negation sign before the whole of Sex and Character, one would have expressed an important truth.

Weininger and the Nazis 
Isolated parts of Weininger's writings were used by Nazi propaganda, despite the fact that Weininger actively argued against the ideas of race that came to be identified with the Nazis. In his private conversations, Hitler recalled a remark his mentor Dietrich Eckart made about Weininger: "I only knew one decent Jew and he committed suicide on the day when he realized that the Jew lives upon the decay of peoples...."

In the chapter titled "Judaism" in his book Sex and Character Weininger writes:
The Jewish race has been chosen by me as a subject of discussion, because, as will be shown, it presents the gravest and most formidable difficulties for my views.

I must, however, make clear what I mean by Judaism; I mean neither a race nor a people nor a recognised creed. I think of it as a tendency of the mind, as a psychological constitution which is a possibility for all mankind, but which has become actual in the most conspicuous fashion only amongst the Jews. Antisemitism itself will confirm my point of view.

Thus the fact is explained that the bitterest Antisemites are to be found amongst the Jews themselves.

The true concept of the State is foreign to the Jew, because he, like the woman, is wanting in personality; his failure to grasp the idea of true society is due to his lack of free intelligible ego. Like women, Jews tend to adhere together, but they do not associate as free independent individuals mutually respecting each other's individuality.

As there is no real dignity in women, so what is meant by the word "gentleman" does not exist amongst the Jews. The genuine Jew fails in this innate good breeding by which alone individuals honour their own individuality and respect that of others. There is no Jewish nobility, and this is the more surprising as Jewish pedigrees can be traced back for thousands of years.

The familiar Jewish arrogance has a similar explanation....

Later in the same chapter he writes: 
The faults of the Jewish race have often been attributed to the repression of that race by Aryans, and many Christians are still disposed to blame themselves in this respect. But the self-reproach is not justified. Outward circumstances do not mould a race in one direction, unless there is in the race the innate tendency to respond to the moulding forces; the total result comes at least as much from a natural disposition as from the modifying circumstances.

The Jew is not really anti-moral. But, none the less, he does not represent the highest ethical type. He is rather non-moral, neither good nor bad.

So also in the case of the woman....

In the Jew and the woman, good and evil are not distinct from one another.

Jews, then, do not live as free, self-governing individuals, choosing between virtue and vice in the Aryan fashion....

Accordingly, Weininger's views are considered an important step in attempts to exclude women and Jews from society based on methodical philosophy, in an era declaring human equality and scientific thought.

In her book Nazi Ideology Prior to 1933, Barbara Miller Lane shows how Nazi ideologists such as Dietrich Eckart disregarded Weininger's deprecation of accusations against individual Jews, and instead simply stated that Jews, like women, lacked a soul and a belief in immortality, and that "Aryans" must guard themselves from "Jewishness" within, since this internal "Jewishness" is the source of evil.

Weininger and "Jewish self-hatred" 
Allan Janik, in "Viennese Culture and the Jewish Self-Hatred Hypothesis: A Critique", questions the validity of the concept of "Jewish self-hatred", even when applied to Weininger, reputedly "the thinker who nearly everyone has taken to represent the very archetype of the self-hating Viennese Jewish intellectual". Janik places responsibility for this reputation upon Peter Gay. Janik doubts that such a concept as "Jewish self-hatred" is applicable to Weininger in any case, because, although he was of Jewish descent, "it is less than clear that he had a Jewish identity" to reject. In Janik's view, Gay misunderstands the role of religion in Jewish identity and "seems to smuggle in a whole lot of covert theological baggage in secularized form", resulting in "a piece of covert metaphysics parading as social science".

Works 
 
 
  Geschlecht und Charakter: Eine prinzipielle Untersuchung, neunzehnte, unveränderte Auflage mit einem Bildnisse des Verfassers (Wien und Leipzig: Wilhelm Braumüller Universitäts-Verlagsbuchhandlung Gesellschaft M. B. H., 1920).

References

Notes

Citations

Sources 
Books

 
 
 
 Janik, Allan (1985). Essays on Wittgenstein and Weininger. Amsterdam: Rodopi.
 
 Janik, Allan (2001). Wittgenstein's Vienna Revisited. New Brunswick, NJ: Transaction Publishers. .
 
 
 
 
 
 
 
 
  This book is a preservation facsimile.
 

Journal Articles

 

Newspapers

 

Online sources

Further reading 
 Abrahamsen, David (1946). The Mind and Death of a Genius. New York: Columbia University Press.

External links 

 Weininger photos and gravesite
 Testimony by Weininger's friend Artur Gerber
 Sex and Character, Cornell University Library Historical Monographs Collection
 
 Works by Otto Weininger at Project Gutenberg

1880 births
1903 suicides
Anti-natalists
Austrian philosophers
Austrian male writers
Antisemitism in Austria
Austrian Protestants
Converts to Protestantism from Judaism
Late modern Christian antisemitism
Austrian Jews
Jewish philosophers
Suicides by firearm in Austria
Writers from Vienna
1903 deaths